Stefano Grondona is an Italian classical guitarist born in 1958. In 2002 he formed the guitar ensemble Nova Lira Orfeo XXI, based on Lira Orfeo - a Barcelona music society of which Miguel Llobet was founder and director.

He has collaborated with Luca Waldner in writing the book La Chitarra di Liuteria - Masterpieces of Guitar Making.

He is Professor of Guitar at the State Conservatory of Vicenza, Veneto, Italy.

Recordings

 Sor, Fernando 20 Studi per Chitarra (Ed. Ricordi Book+CD played by S.Grondona) 
 Bach, Giuliani, Turina, Ponce (C.G.D. Classica cls91042)
 Bach, Henze, Petrassi (Dynamic CDS059)
 Novecento (Josè, Martin, Krenek, Morricone, Tansman) (1995, Phoenix 98419)
 La Guitarra de Torres (Llobet, Tárrega) (1996/7, Divox CDX-29701)
 Evocación (Albéniz & Granados) (2000, Stradivarius STR 33658)
 Lo Cant dels Aucells (2000, Stradivarius 33589)
 Baroque Images (Froberger, Bach, Scarlatti) (2001, Stradivarius STR 33622)
 Arcas Julián (2004, Stradivarius 33692)
 Homenaje (2006, Stradivarius STR 33660)
 Respuesta (2006, Stradivarius STR 33770)
 Humoresque Llobet & Anido in the 1920s (2007, Stradivarius STR 33815)
 Grondona plays Asturias (2009, Stradivarius STR 33832)

Video
Ruggero Chiesa, Guitar Gradus (Grondona plays Sor & Walton) (Suvini-Zerboni ESZ.10224)

External links

Articles
 Classical guitarist strums up interest by Jason Cheah, 1 March 2005 (thestar online)
 Andaluza No5 Video

Information
Biography (divox)
Biography (Aquila Corde Armoniche)
Biography (ipecc) 
Nova Lira Orfeo XXI Homepage
Nova Lira Orfeo XXI (guitarra.artepulsado) 

Italian classical guitarists
Italian male guitarists
1958 births
Living people